Jill Cherry (born 1 March 1998) is a track and field athlete from Glasgow, Scotland. She won a bronze medal at the 2017 European Athletics U20 Championships in the 4 x 400 metres relay after running the heats for the British team, and bronze at the 2022 Commonwealth Games 4 x 400 metres relay running for Scotland.

Early life
From Airdrie, Cherry attended St Margaret’s High School.

Career
Cherry came fourth in the 2022 British Indoor Athletics Championships over 800 metres.

At the 2022 Commonwealth Games Cherry, who runs for the Victoria Park City of Glasgow, ran in the 4 x 400 metres relay in which the Scottish team won the bronze medal.

References

1998 births
Living people
Commonwealth Games bronze medallists for Scotland
Commonwealth Games medallists in athletics
Athletes (track and field) at the 2022 Commonwealth Games
Scottish female sprinters
Sportspeople from Glasgow
Medallists at the 2022 Commonwealth Games